Courtney Kennedy (born March 29, 1979) is an American ice hockey player. She won a silver medal at the 2002 Winter Olympics and a bronze medal at the 2006 Winter Olympics.

Kennedy was born in Woburn, Massachusetts. She went to elementary school in the Reeves Elementary School. She played college hockey at Colby College before transferring to the University of Minnesota along with her sister Shannon. In 2008 Kennedy was inducted into University of Minnesota M Club Hall of Fame.

She is the former head coach of Buckingham Browne & Nichols girls' varsity ice hockey team. She is the current assistant head coach of Boston College Eagles women's ice hockey team.

Kennedy is on the executive board of USA Hockey. She is assistant director of the Kennedy School of Hockey.

References

External links
 Courtney Kennedy's U.S. Olympic Team bio

1979 births
American women's ice hockey players
Boston College Eagles women's ice hockey coaches
Buckingham Browne & Nichols School alumni
Colby College alumni
Ice hockey coaches from Massachusetts
Ice hockey players at the 2002 Winter Olympics
Ice hockey players at the 2006 Winter Olympics
Living people
Medalists at the 2002 Winter Olympics
Medalists at the 2006 Winter Olympics
Minnesota Golden Gophers women's ice hockey players
Olympic bronze medalists for the United States in ice hockey
Olympic silver medalists for the United States in ice hockey
People from Woburn, Massachusetts
Ice hockey players from Massachusetts